Nikola Hofmanova (born 3 February 1991, as Nikola Hofmanová) is an Austrian former professional tennis player.

Hofmanova was born in Chomutov, Czechoslovakia. She won three singles and two doubles titles on the ITF Circuit in her career. On 12 April 2010, she reached her best singles ranking of world No. 161. On 18 July 2011, she peaked at No. 223 in the doubles rankings.

As a junior, Hofmanova was ranked as high as world No. 4. She won the Orange Bowl Tennis Championships in 2006.

Between 2006 and 2009, she played four rubbers for the Austria Fed Cup team.

In August 2015, Hofmanova played her last match on the pro circuit.

ITF Circuit finals

Singles: 8 (3 titles, 5 runner-ups)

Doubles: 8 (2 titles, 6 runner-ups)

References

External links
 
 
 

1991 births
Living people
Sportspeople from Chomutov
People from Eisenstadt-Umgebung District
Austrian female tennis players
Austrian people of Czech descent
Sportspeople from Burgenland
Czech emigrants to Austria